Shraga Feivel Halevy Zimmerman is the av beis din of the Federation of Synagogues in London. He accepted the position on the 30th of June 2019, but took office in January 2020. Rabbi Zimmerman succeeded Dayan Lichtenstein as head of the organisation's religious court. He took up this appointment following 11 and-a-half years serving as rabbi and av beis din of the Jewish community in Gateshead, United Kingdom, where he succeeded Bezalel Rakow, who died in 2003. Prior to that, he served as rabbi to Khal Adath Jeshurun, the Haredi German Ashkenazic community in Monsey, New York.

Overview
Zimmerman's induction in Gateshead was attended by several Haredi rabbis in England, including Rabbi Ephraim Padwa of UOHC and Menachem Mendel Schneebalg of Manchester's Machzikei Hadath community. One of the changes he made was to allow the opening of the
community's "first kosher restaurant" with the proviso that "to avoid unsupervised interaction between the sexes" there are 
separate hours for men and women.

In January 2020 he left his Gateshead position, "taking up his appointment as av beis din of the Federation."

Early life
The New Jersey-born Zimmerman grew up in Borough Park, Brooklyn. He is an alumnus of the Mirrer yeshiva in Flatbush and a close disciple of Rabbis Shmuel Berenbaum and Meshulam Dovid Soloveitchik. Prior to that, he studied at Beer Shmuel in Borough Park, a yeshiva that was founded by his grandfather, Rabbi Yosef Yonah Tzvi Horowitz, rabbi of Unsdorf and Frankfurt and in Letchworth during the war years, who was also one of the rabbis of K'hal Adath Jeshurun in Frankfurt, Germany after Joseph Breuer before World War II. That grandfather had named the yeshiva after an acestor known as the Be'er Shmuel, Rav Shmuel Rosenberg of Unsdorf (1842-1919).

Shailatext project
When Zimmerman arrived 2020 to his new post in London, the Federation was in the process of starting what they called their Shailatext project, a people-powered technology based process for answering Halachic questions, especially for "those who have not yet found a rabbi." An interviewer noted in mid-2019 that "Zimmerman estimates that he has answered 200,000 sh’eilos from all over the United Kingdom while in Gateshead — in person, over the phone, and by email and text."

Personal
He is married to Rebbetzin Chaya Reena Zimmerman.

References

Sources
 Gateshead Crowns its new Rov
Next Stop London

External links
 Rabbi Zimmerman @ Federation of Synagogues

20th-century American rabbis
21st-century English rabbis
British Orthodox rabbis
Haredi rabbis in Europe
Levites
Living people
People from Borough Park, Brooklyn
Year of birth missing (living people)
People from Gateshead